Miss Little Havana is the twelfth studio album by Cuban-American recording artist Gloria Estefan.  The singer's first English-language album since 2003's Unwrapped and her twenty-sixth overall, it was released on September 27, 2011 on Crescent Moon Records, distributed by Verve Forecast and Universal Music Group. The project was largely conceived and produced by urban producer Pharrell Williams, while Estefan's husband Emilio Estefan contributed another four tracks to the album. In the US, the album was released only through Target stores.

Preceding the album's release, lead single "Wepa" was released for digital download in July 2011, and reached the top of the Billboard Hot Dance Club Songs chart.

Background
Estefan announced her retirement from music after the release of her studio album 90 Millas in 2007. Three years later American producer and performer Pharrell Williams presented Estefan with two songs, "I Can't Believe" and "Miss Little Havana", which the singer liked, and they began working on them in the recording studio while writing the rest of the songs included on Miss Little Havana. Estefan  first became interested in collaborating with Williams after meeting him through their trainer at a Miami gym in early 2010. The pair began sending messages back and forth, while Williams started writing songs he hoped Estefan would want to record. It was not until early 2011, they entered the recording booth to create the basis for Miss Little Havana.  The album was recorded in English with some Spanish lyrics. Coincidentally, the album was released on the 25th anniversary of her single "Conga", and with the CD purchase a new version of the track, titled "Conga 25", is available for download.

Critical reception

Stephen Thomas Erlewine's review in Allmusic described Pharrell's rhythms as lively but "straightjacketed", and mentioning that the Cuban-like rhythms are too "stiff and mannered, and certainly not like the colorful, endless party its singer and producer intended". Slant Magazine's Eric Henderson commended Pharrell and Estefan for "managing to avoid the many pitfalls left in dance music's wake by the likes of David Guetta, Pitbull, LMFAO, and so on." However, Henderson was ambivalent towards the album's "patina of dress-up dance music", which he distinguished as "dance music worn in the manner of an expertly executed Halloween costume, both uncannily close to the mark at the same time as it's jovially self-lampooning".

Track listing

Charts

Release history

References

External links
GloriaEstefan.com > Album

2011 albums
Gloria Estefan albums
Albums produced by Emilio Estefan
Albums produced by Pharrell Williams
Verve Forecast Records albums